The Hörby transmitter (Hörbymasten in Swedish) is a transmission mast located in Östra Sallerup, near Hörby in the southmost part of Sweden operated by national broadcaster Sveriges Radio. Due to its location in the middle of the province, it provides FM radio and television to most of Scania. It is 320 metres high and when opened in October 1959 it was one of the tallest structures in Europe.

It transmits the four national channels from Sveriges Radio: SR P1, SR P2, SR P3 and SR P4. Two versions of P4 are provided: SR Malmöhus and SR Kristianstad. The only remaining short wave radio transmissions also originate from outside Hörby, but are broadcast from the Hörby short wave transmitter.

The Hörby transmitter is among the last in Sweden to terminate its analogue signals. The analogue television channels carried by the transmitter were SVT1, SVT2 and TV4, all on UHF, which is unusual as SVT1 was usually broadcast on VHF. The analogue broadcasts of SVT2 and TV4 were closed down on October 15, 2007, with SVT1 continuing its broadcast for two more weeks.

The station has been broadcasting digital television (DVB-T) since 1999 and carries all seven national multiplexes.

On 2 April 2011 some short wave antennas have been blasted and dismantled. Among these the curtain antenna "G1".

Towers in Sweden
Hörby Municipality